Town 'n' Country is a census-designated place (CDP) in Hillsborough County, Florida, United States. The population was 85,951 at the 2020 census.

Within Town 'n' Country are located Bay Crest Park, Countryway, Rocky Creek, Sweetwater Creek.

History
Prior to the 1950s, Town 'n' Country was primarily natural areas and cattle farms. In 1958, the LaMonte-Shimberg Corporation purchased a 525-acre dairy farm from the Webb family near the Hillsborough Avenue-Memorial intersection to construct the Town 'n' Country Park subdivision, making the area one of Tampa’s first suburban communities. By the time the original developers and builders of Town 'n' Country had built their last house, the area covered more than 2,000 acres and stretched over three miles from Memorial Highway on the south to north of Waters Avenue. In this area, nearly 8,000 single-family homes and townhouses were built from 1958 to 1978 by LaMonte-Shimberg.

Due to Town ‘n’ Country’s close proximity to the historically Spanish and Cuban American West Tampa, the area always had somewhat of a Cuban American presence. Though it wasn’t until the early 1980s, when there was a large influx of recent Cuban arrivals, whom began to settle in Town ‘n’ Country. As of the 2020 U.S. Census, Latino’s make up the majority of Town ‘n’ Country’s residents; most of whom are Cuban and Puerto Rican. Although, in recent years the area has seen a large influx of Dominicans, Brazilians, Venezuelans, Columbians and Mexicans settling in the area, making the community a diverse ethnic enclave of Latino’s. Surrounding communities, such as Egypt Lake-Leto and Drew Park, also happen to be majority Latino communities. Many locals tend to refer to this entire area as West Tampa, which is actually incorrect; as the actual boundaries of Old West Tampa are north of Kennedy Boulevard to Dr. Martin Luther King Boulevard (formerly Buffalo Avenue), then West of Rome Avenue to Dale Mabry Highway.

ZIP code 
The ZIP code for Town 'n' Country is 33615; other nearby ZIP codes include 33634 and 33635.

Geography
Town 'n' Country is located in western Hillsborough County at  (28.010046, -82.572815). The CDP is bordered to the north by Westchase, Citrus Park, and Carrollwood, and to the east by Egypt Lake-Leto. To the west is the city of Oldsmar in Pinellas County. The northwest portion of Tampa International Airport is located within Town 'n' Country CDP.

Demographics

As of the census of 2010, there were 78,422 people living in the CDP. The racial makeup of the CDP was 76.0% White, 9.7% African American, 0.4% Native American, 4.1% Asian, 0.1% Pacific Islander, 6.1% some other race, and 3.7% from two or more races. Hispanic or Latino of any race were 43.8% of the population.

There were 30,417 households in the CDP, out of which 33.5% had children under the age of 18 living with them, 42.7% were headed by married couples living together, 13.9% had a female householder with no husband present, and 35.3% were non-families. 26.2% of all households were made up of individuals, and 6.6% were someone living alone who was 65 years of age or older. The average household size was 2.57, and the average family size was 3.10.

In the CDP, 22.2% of the population were under the age of 18, 9.6% were from 18 to 24, 30.3% were from 25 to 44, 26.2% were from 45 to 64, and 11.6% were 65 years of age or older. The median age was 37.2 years. For every 100 females, there were 95.1 males. For every 100 females age 18 and over, there were 92.3 males.

For the period 2011–15, the estimated median annual income for a household in the CDP was $49,559, and the median income for a family was $54,644. Male full-time workers had a median income of $39,453 versus $36,374 for females. The per capita income for the CDP was $25,195. About 13.0% of families and 15.7% of the population were below the poverty line, including 25.4% of those under age 18 and 11.9% of those age 65 or over.

References

Census-designated places in Hillsborough County, Florida
Census-designated places in Florida
Populated places on Tampa Bay
1956 establishments in Florida
Populated places established in 1956